Nataliya Anatoliïvna Skakun (born August 3, 1981 in Altai Kray) is a Ukrainian weightlifter.

Career
She competed in the women's 63 kg weight class at the 2004 Summer Olympics and won the gold medal, lifting 242.5 kg in total. During clean & jerk she lifted 135.0 kg, which was a new Olympic record. She also for a time held the world record, 138.0 kg, set when she became world champion in 2003.

References
sports-reference

1981 births
Living people
Ukrainian female weightlifters
Weightlifters at the 2000 Summer Olympics
Weightlifters at the 2004 Summer Olympics
Olympic weightlifters of Ukraine
Olympic gold medalists for Ukraine
Olympic medalists in weightlifting
Medalists at the 2004 Summer Olympics
20th-century Ukrainian women
21st-century Ukrainian women